The 61st (2nd South Midland) Division was an infantry division of the British Army raised in 1915 during the Great War as a second-line reserve for the first-line battalions of the 48th (South Midland) Division. The division was sent to the Western Front in May 1916 and served there for the duration of the First World War.

Unit history
The division landed in France in May 1916. On 19 July 1916, together with the 5th Australian Division, the 61st Division fought the Battle of Fromelles, designed as a feint attack as part of the Somme Offensive. The attack, against well prepared German positions based on a ridge, was a disaster and responsible for the subsequent poor reputation of the Division. The division later took part in the advance to the Hindenburg Line and the Third Battle of Ypres.

Order of Battle
The order of battle was as follows:
 182nd (2nd Warwickshire) Brigade 
 2/5th Battalion, Royal Warwickshire Regiment (disbanded February 1918)
 2/6th Battalion, Royal Warwickshire Regiment
 2/7th Battalion, Royal Warwickshire Regiment
 2/8th Battalion, Royal Warwickshire Regiment (disbanded February 1918)
 2/8th Battalion, Worcestershire Regiment (from 183rd Bde. February 1918)

 183rd (2nd Gloucester and Worcester) Brigade 
The brigade contained the following battalions until February 1918 when
most of them were disbanded.
 2/4th (City of Bristol) Battalion, Gloucestershire Regiment
 2/6th Battalion, Gloucestershire Regiment
 2/7th Battalion, Worcestershire Regiment
 2/8th Battalion, Worcestershire Regiment (to 182nd Bde. February 1918)

Between February and June 1918 the 183rd Brigade contained the following
battalions.
 1/9th (Highlanders) Battalion, Royal Scots (Lothian Regiment)
 1/5th (Buchan and Formartin) Battalion, Gordon Highlanders
 1/8th (Argyllshire) Battalion, Argyll and Sutherland Highlanders

From May 1918 the following battalions joined the Brigade.
 1st Battalion, East Lancashire Regiment
 9th (Service) Battalion, Northumberland Fusiliers
 11th (Service) Battalion, Suffolk Regiment

 184th (2nd South Midland) Brigade 
 2/5th Battalion, Gloucestershire Regiment
 2/4th Battalion, Oxfordshire and Buckinghamshire Light Infantry
 2/1st Buckinghamshire Battalion, Oxfordshire and Buckinghamshire Light Infantry (disbanded February 1918)
 2/4th Battalion, Royal Berkshire Regiment

 Divisional Troops  
 1/5th Bn, the Duke of Cornwall's Light Infantry joined as Divisional Pioneer Bn April 1916
 267th Machine Gun Company joined 18 January 1918, moved to 61st Bn MGC 1 March 1918
 61st Battalion MGC formed 1 March 1918

 Divisional Mounted Troops 
 2/1st Bedfordshire Yeomanry joined October 1915, left February 1916
 2/2nd County of London Yeomanry joined 24 January 1916, left February 1916
 C Sqn, 1/1st Hampshire Yeomanry joined 18 March 1916, left 7 June 1916
 2nd South Midland Divisional Cyclist Company left June 1916

 61st (2nd South Midland) Divisional Artillery  (the artillery of 59th Division was also attached between 8 and 26 August 1918)
 CCCV (2/I South Midland) Brigade, Royal Field Artillery (RFA) broken up 17 September 1916
 CCCVI (2/II South Midland) Brigade, RFA 
 CCCVII (2/III South Midland) Brigade, RFA 
 CCCVIII (2/IV S.M.) (Howitzer) Brigade, RFA broken up 27 January 1917
 2/1st South Midland (Warwicks) Heavy Battery, Royal Garrison Artillery (RGA) left 3 February 1916
 2/2nd London Heavy Battery RGA joined 24 January 1916, left 3 February 1916
 1/1st Wessex Heavy Battery RGA attached 24 January to February 1916
 2/1st Wessex Heavy Battery RGA attached 24 January to February 1916
 61st Divisional Ammunition Column RFA 
 V.61 Heavy Trench Mortar Battery, RFA formed by 16 August 1916; left 7 February 1918
 X.61, Y.61 and Z.61 Medium Mortar Batteries, RFA formed June 1916; on 7 February 1918, Z broken up and batteries reorganised to have 6 x 6-inch weapons each

 61st (2nd South Midland) Divisional Engineers  
 477th (2/1st South Midland) Field Company moved independently to France and joined 48th Division June 1915
 478th (2/2nd South Midland) Field Company 
 479th (3/1st South Midland) Field Company 
 476th (1/3rd South Midland) Field Company joined by May 1916
 61st Divisional Signals Company 

 Royal Army Medical Corps 
 2/1st South Midland Field Ambulance 
 2/2nd South Midland Ambulance 
 2/3rd South Midland Field Ambulance 
 61st Sanitary Section left for IV Corps 12 April 1917

 Other Divisional Troops 
 61st Divisional Train ASC 521, 522, 523 and 524 Companies ASC
 2/1st South Midland Mobile Veterinary Section AVC 
 251st Divisional Employment Company joined 7 June 1917

Battles
 Battle of Fromelles

General Officer Commanding
Commanding officers were:
 Major-General Richard Bannatine-Allason, September 1915 – February 1916
 Major-General Sir Colin Mackenzie, KCB, February 1916 – May 1918
 Major-General F. John Duncan, CB, CMG, DSO 1918

See also

 List of British divisions in World War I

References

External links
 The Long, Long, Trail: The British Army in the Great War, The 61st (2nd South Midland) Division

Infantry divisions of the British Army in World War I
Military units and formations established in 1915
Military units and formations disestablished in 1919